JMRC may refer to:

Jaipur Metro, an Indian rapid transit system partly owned by the Jaipur Metro Rail Corporation
Journal of Medieval Religious Cultures, an academic journal